Jean-Luc Baker (born October 7, 1993) is a British-American ice dancer. With his skating partner, Kaitlin Hawayek, he is the 2018 Four Continents champion, the 2018 NHK Trophy champion, and a four-time U.S. national bronze medalist (2019–22). 

Earlier in their career, he and Hawayek became the 2014 World Junior champions, the 2013 Junior Grand Prix Final silver medalists, and the 2014 U.S. national junior champions.

Personal life 
Jean-Luc Baker was born in Burnley, England. He is the son of Sharon Jones Baker, who represented the United Kingdom in ice dancing at the 1988 Winter Olympics, and Stephen Baker, who competed for the U.K. in pair skating at the 1976 World Junior Championships.

Baker was born with a club foot. When he was four, he moved to the United States with his family. He attended Harbour Pointe Middle School and Kamiak High School in Mukilteo, Washington. After graduation, he moved to Detroit, Michigan to pursue his career. He has a black belt in taekwondo.

Career

Early years 
Jean-Luc Baker was introduced to ice skating by his parents in 1995. He was inspired to switch from singles to ice dancing by his mother. He teamed up with Joylyn Yang in the summer of 2006, with his parents coaching the duo. They won U.S. national titles on the juvenile and intermediate levels and took the novice bronze medal at the 2010 U.S. Championships. The following season, Yang/Baker were assigned to two ISU Junior Grand Prix events, finishing seventh in Japan and tenth in the Czech Republic. They were sixth on the junior level at the 2011 U.S. Championships.

2012–2013 season: First season with Hawayek 
Baker teamed up with Kaitlin Hawayek in June 2012. They were sent to two JGP events and won the silver medal in Germany. Hawayek/Baker took the junior silver medal at the 2013 U.S. Championships and were assigned to the 2013 World Junior Championships in Milan where they finished seventh.

2013–2014 season: World Junior title 
During the 2013–14 ISU Junior Grand Prix, Hawayek/Baker won the gold medal in their JGP events at the JGP Mexico and the JGP Poland. Their results qualified them to the JGP Final in Fukuoka, Japan, where they won the silver medal. They then won the gold medal at the 2014 World Junior Championships, setting a new Junior World record for the overall score with a total of 157.12 points.

2014–2015 season: First Grand Prix medal 
Hawayek/Baker began their season at an ISU Challenger Series event, the 2014 Nebelhorn Trophy. They finished fourth after placing fourth in the short and third in the free dance. Their Grand Prix assignments were the 2014 Rostelecom Cup and 2014 NHK Trophy, winning the bronze medal at the latter.

2015–2016 season 
Baker sustained a concussion when Hawayek accidentally struck him with her arm in September 2015, just before the Labor Day weekend. He returned to limited training after two weeks and full training a week later.

Hawayek/Baker finished fourth at the 2015 Skate America. Due to food poisoning, Hawayek vomited eight times in four hours during the night before the short dance at the 2015 Cup of China. After competing in the first segment, the duo decided to withdraw. They placed fifth at the 2016 U.S. Championships.

2016–2017 season 
Hawayek/Baker won the silver medal at the 2016 CS Autumn Classic International. Competing on the Grand Prix series, they finished sixth at the 2016 Skate Canada International and fourth at the 2016 NHK Trophy.

2017–2018 season: Four Continents title 
Beginning the season at the 2017 CS U.S. Classic, Hawayek/Baker won the silver medal.  Their Grand Prix assignments were the 2018 Skate Canada International, where they placed fourth, and the 2018 Skate America, where they placed fifth.  Following the Grand Prix, they competed in a second Challenger event, the 2017 CS Golden Spin of Zagreb, winning the bronze medal.

Hawayek/Baker won the pewter medal at the 2018 U.S. Championships and were assigned to the 2018 Four Continents Championships, as the top three teams were sent to the 2018 Winter Olympics.  They won the gold medal at Four Continents, finishing 9.33 points ahead of silver medalists Carolane Soucisse / Shane Firus.  Baker remarked, "it was really awesome; it was a new experience for us. We’ve medaled at junior events and sporadically at senior events in Grand Prixs or senior Bs. It was a really cool experience, and we hope to do it more often in the future."

Following the withdrawal of Maia and Alex Shibutani, they were named to the US team for the 2018 World Championships in Milan, where they placed tenth.  On April 20, 2018, they announced that in the summer, they would begin training under Marie-France Dubreuil and Patrice Lauzon in Montreal, Quebec, Canada.

2018–2019 season: Grand Prix gold, national bronze 
Baker sustained a concussion during training in August 2018, and as a result, they withdrew from the 2018 CS Finlandia Trophy.  At their first Grand Prix assignment, the 2018 NHK Trophy, the withdrawal of Gabriella Papadakis / Guillaume Cizeron due to injury left several teams competing for the gold medal.  Hawayek/Baker came second in the rhythm dance, behind Tiffany Zahorski / Jonathan Guerreiro, but narrowly placed first in the free dance, winning the title overall.  Hawayek called it "just such a pleasure and honor to be here performing" and was especially pleased with their results, given they "had just three weeks of training fully recovered" prior.  They placed only fourth at the 2018 Internationaux de France, but their results qualified them for the Grand Prix Final in Vancouver, where they placed sixth.

At the 2019 U.S. Championships, Hawayker/Baker won the bronze medal.  Reflecting on their move to Montreal, Hawayek called it "a great training center that we’re happy to be a part of. It makes us feel able to skate more openly and freely, and I think we’ll continue that for the next few years."  They were assigned to the 2019 Four Continents Championships, where they finished fifth, and the 2019 World Championships, where they placed ninth.

2019–2020 season 
Beginning the season at the 2019 CS Nebelhorn Trophy, Hawayek/Baker placed fourth in the rhythm dance but took the silver medal overall after coming second in the free dance.  

For their first Grand Prix assignment, they competed at 2019 Skate Canada International, where they were third after the rhythm dance.  In the free dance, they dropped behind the British team Fear/Gibson. Competing at the 2019 Cup of China, Hawayek/Baker placed fifth in the rhythm dance after struggling on the Finnstep pattern dance. Several errors in the free dance kept them in fifth in that segment as well, and overall.

Hawayek/Baker placed third in the rhythm dance at the 2020 U.S. Championships and praised the crowd reception of their Saturday Night Fever program.  Third in the free dance, they also won their second national bronze medal.

At the 2020 Four Continents Championships in Seoul, they placed seventh in the rhythm dance after a double fall out of their dance lift, which Hawayek described as "a fluke thing that happened."  Fifth in the free dance, they rose to sixth place overall. They were assigned to compete at the World Championships in Montreal, but these were canceled as a result of the coronavirus pandemic.

2020–2021 season 
With the pandemic ongoing, Hawayek and Baker opted to return to live with Hawayek's parents in Buffalo, New York for the early months and were able to do some on-ice training when the rink in Buffalo was reopened as an essential workers' daycare, communicating with their coaches over Zoom.  After quarantine, they returned to Montreal in June and rejoined their coaches at the Ice Academy of Montreal in July.  With the Grand Prix assigned based mainly on training location, Hawayek/Baker nevertheless were assigned to the 2020 Skate America in Las Vegas and crossed the border again to attend.  They won the silver medal.

Returning to the United States again for the 2021 U.S. Championships, also held in Las Vegas, Hawayek/Baker placed third in the rhythm dance.  They were also third in the free dance, taking their third consecutive bronze medal.  They were assigned to the American team for the 2021 World Championships in Stockholm.  They placed eleventh in the rhythm dance and rose to ninth overall after the free dance.

Hawayek/Baker were chosen as America's dance entry in the 2021 World Team Trophy and finished third in both segments, while Team USA won the silver medal.

2021–2022 season: Beijing Olympics 
For the Olympic season, the duo opted for a free program to Frédéric Chopin's Prelude in E minor and Nocturne in E minor, music that Hawayek said she had long dreamed of skating to, saying that "there is a lot of maturity and depth in this music. There is nostalgia, hopefulness, and happiness. I envisioned something that was not too heavy but also not too youthful."

Hawayek sustained a concussion and received stitches to her head after a fall while practicing a lift in early July 2021. As a result, Hawayek/Baker withdrew from both the 2021 U.S. Classic and their first Grand Prix assignment, the 2021 NHK Trophy. They competed for the first time at the 2021 Rostelecom Cup, finishing in fifth place. They also competed on the Challenger series at the 2021 CS Golden Spin of Zagreb, winning the gold medal.

Hawayek/Baker entered the 2022 U.S. Championships seeking to make up ground on the previous year's pewter medalists, Green/Parsons, who had enjoyed a strong fall season while Hawayek/Baker were absent and recovering. Both teams made twizzle errors in the rhythm dance, with Hawayek/Baker in fourth place, 1.46 points behind Green/Parsons. Delivering a strong free dance, they were third in that segment and took their fourth consecutive bronze medal. She said afterward that "this means so much to us. It has not been a straight journey to this for us whatsoever over the last four years, especially over the last six months." The following day, they were named to their first American Olympic team.

Competing at the 2022 Winter Olympics in the dance event, Hawayek/Baker placed eleventh in the rhythm dance. For Hawayek, it was "an absolute joy to perform out there." They were tenth in the free dance, remaining in eleventh overall. For the Olympic gala, Baker choreographed Alysa Liu's program using the Itzy song "Loco," which was praised by both the musical group and its fans.

Hawayek and Baker concluded the season at the 2022 World Championships, held in Montpellier, France.  Russian skaters were banned from the event by the International Skating Union due to their country's invasion of Ukraine. The team placed ninth in the rhythm dance, eighth in the free dance, and eighth overall.

2022–2023 season 
Hawayek and Baker enlisted Italian choreographer Massimo Scali to work on their rhythm dance for the new season, a program of Desi Arnaz's music inspired by Arnaz's dynamic with Lucille Ball. For the free dance, they chose music by Norwegian singer Askjell, citing his "very modern-day take on the essence of classical music."

The team made their season debut at the 2022 CS Finlandia Trophy, where they finished second behind Canadian training partners Fournier Beaudry/Sørensen. Hawayek/Baker then began the Grand Prix at the 2022 Skate America, winning the silver medal and notably finishing first in the free dance due to technical errors by American gold medalists Chock/Bates. They finished 0.73 points behind Chock/Bates overall. At their second assignment, the 2022 Grand Prix of Espoo, Hawayek and Baker finished second in the rhythm dance, clearing the 80-point threshold for the first time with a score of 80.93. They finished second in the free dance as well, taking their second Grand Prix silver medal and qualifying to the Grand Prix Final.

Appearing at the Final in Turin, they were sixth of the six teams in the rhythm dance but rose to fifth place after Fournier Beaudry/Sørensen dropped following a fall in the free dance. Baker said they were "thrilled" with their performance but disappointed with their marks, vowing to "continue to build for our next events."

On January 17, Hawayek/Baker announced that they were withdrawing from the 2023 U.S. Championships, saying that they had been dealing with "with significant physical injuries that have led to challenges in our mental health and we feel it is in our best interest to prioritize this currently." They said that they would petition to be included on the World Championship team on the strength of their results that season and in years prior. Following the U.S. Championships, U.S. Figure Skating approved their petition, and they were announced as part of the World team on January 29. However, on February 24 it was announced that they had withdrawn to further prioritize "their healing and mental health." They were replaced by Christina Carreira and Anthony Ponomarenko.

Programs

With Hawayek

With Yang

Competitive highlights 
GP: Grand Prix; CS: Challenger Series; JGP: Junior Grand Prix

With Hawayek

With Yang

Detailed results

References

External links 
 
 
 Kaitlin Hawayek / Jean-Luc Baker at IceNetwork.com

1993 births
Living people
People from Burnley
English male ice dancers
American male ice dancers
English emigrants to the United States
World Junior Figure Skating Championships medalists
Four Continents Figure Skating Championships medalists
American male taekwondo practitioners
English male taekwondo practitioners
Figure skaters at the 2022 Winter Olympics
Olympic figure skaters of the United States